Heather Gordon (born 1967) is an American contemporary visual artist.

Career 
Gordon creates large-scale paintings and immersive art projects, using numbers, algorithms, and geometry in her creative process.

In November 2017 Gordon's installation And Then the Sun Swallowed Me was exhibited at the Contemporary Art Museum of Raleigh.

Her piece Cinnabar was featured in the North Carolina Museum of Art's exhibit titled You Are Here: Light, Color, and Sound Experiences from April 7, 2018 until July 2, 2018.  Prior to the exhibit, her work was featured as part of the museum's Matrons of the Arts initiative, highlighting female-identified artists from around the world. She received a North Carolina Artists Fellowship in 2014.

Her collaborate works with dancer and choreographer Justin Tornow, titled Echo and SHOW, were shown at 21c Durham Museum Hotel and The Durham Fruit. In 2017 Gordon and Tornow collaborated to create No.19/Modulations, which was shown at the CCB Plaza in downtown Durham, North Carolina.

In August 2018 her work titled DOUBLE EDGED: Geometric Abstraction Then and Now was shown at the Weatherspoon Art Museum. Also in 2018, she debuted Steel, a tape installation, at The Dillon in Raleigh, North Carolina.

Her work has also been shown at the Ackland Art Museum, Waterworks, The Carrack Modern Art Museum, and the North Carolina School of Science and Math. She is part of Mural Durham, an art project in Durham.

In 2019 Gordon worked with the David M Rubenstein Rare Book & Manuscript Library and the Duke University Archives to research documents related to the Duke Forest for her work titled Forest for the Trees.

Personal life 
Gordon was the only child of an accountant and engineer. Her father was a United States Air Force officer, and grew up primarily on military bases around the United States. Godron is lesbian, and said she knew when she was eight years old.

Gordon earned a Bachelor of Fine Arts degree from the University of Florida in 1990 and a Master of Fine Arts degree from New Mexico State University in 1995. She lives in Durham. Gordon has a son named Henry.

References 

Living people
1967 births
21st-century American painters
21st-century American women artists
American conceptual artists
American contemporary painters
American digital artists
American women installation artists
American installation artists
American multimedia artists
New Mexico State University alumni
People from Durham, North Carolina
University of Florida alumni
Women conceptual artists
Women multimedia artists
American lesbian artists